The Blue Bowl is a public house in Hanham, South Gloucestershire, situated on Hanham High Street. It is thought to be one of the oldest pubs in the United Kingdom, being said to date back to the 14th century. There are no official records as to the age, but Saint Lyte wrote that it was an old established hostelry in 1480. The name of the pub was changed to 'The Millhouse’ in the late 20th century, but after objections from the public it was reverted to The Blue Bowl.

It is currently owned by Sizzling Pubs.

References

Pubs in Bristol
Pubs in Gloucestershire